Stoke-on-Trent College is  a provider of further and higher education based in Stoke-on-Trent. The college has two campuses: one, called Cauldon Campus, in Shelton and one in Burslem.

Stoke-on-Trent college is part of UniQ, the university quarter. A collaborative project with Staffordshire University and the Stoke-on-Trent Sixth Form College.

Education
The college runs a range of courses, from basic English and Maths to foundation degree courses. The college has the largest number of higher education students of any college in North Staffordshire.

The college does not offer a-levels which are instead the responsibility of City of Stoke-on-Trent Sixth Form College.

The College is a member of the Collab Group of high performing schools.

Ofsted
The January 2014 Ofsted rating of the college gave it a good overall.

Sites

Cauldon

The main site to the college is Cauldon Campus in the Shelton area of the city. This site is where the majority of the courses are run from.

Burslem
The other site is located on Moorland Road in the Burslem area of the city which contains the sites for Construction, Plumbing, Gas, Motor Vehicle Maintenance as well as Media and Performing Arts. It is also the location of Stoke Studio College which specialises in Manufacturing and Design Engineering and the John Seddon Technology centre. Open and closing times are:

Thursday	8:30am–4:30pm
Friday	8:30am–4:30pm
Saturday	Closed
Sunday	Closed
Monday	8:30am–4:30pm
Tuesday	8:30am–4:30pm
Wednesday	8:30am–4:30pm

Science Centre
The Science Centre is a teaching facility that opened in 2012 and run by Staffordshire University and is also used by the Stoke-on-Trent Sixth Form College.

College Academies Trust
Stoke-on-Trent College is the main sponsor of the College Academies Trust, a group of schools within Stoke-on-Trent. Schools in the trust include Discovery Academy, Excel Academy, Maple Court Academy and Stoke Studio College.

Heatwave Radio
In 2013 the college launched its own student radio station called Heatwave Radio which broadcasts from 2 studios within the J Block of Burslem Campus.

The Station is entirely managed by students and presented by lecturers and students and is a member of the Student Radio Association. The station broadcasts a mixture of popular music and specialist programmes in genres such as Dance, Hot AC and unsigned music. The station broadcasts 24 hours per day but for the majority of the time broadcasts non-stop music.

References

External links
 Stoke.net page on Stoke on Trent College
 Cove homepage - Learning and Skills Council

Buildings and structures in Stoke-on-Trent
Education in Staffordshire
Education in Stoke-on-Trent
Further education colleges in Staffordshire
Further education colleges in the Collab Group